Govardhan is a town in Uttar Pradesh, India.

Govardhan may also refer to:

as a surname:

Gampa Govardhan, Indian politician, member of the Telangana Legislature

as a given name:

Govardhan of Gour, 13th-century monarch
Govardhan (Mughal painter), 17th-century artist
Govardhan Asrani (born 1941), Indian actor and filmmaker popularly known as Asrani 
Govardhan Mangilal Sharma, Indian politician, member of the Maharashtra Legislative Assembly
Govardhan Upadhyay, Indian politician, member of the Indian National Congress

See also